Robert Hendricks "Bob" Brink (born November 27, 1946) is an American politician. A member of the Democratic Party, he served in the Virginia House of Delegates from 1998 to 2014, representing the 48th district in the Arlington and Fairfax County suburbs of Washington, D.C. He resigned to become deputy commissioner for aging services in the administration of Governor Terry McAuliffe.

Committee service
During his time in the Virginia House of Delegates, Brink served on the House committees on Appropriations (2006–2014), Chesapeake and Its Tributaries (1998–1999), Courts of Justice (2004–2005), Health, Welfare and Institutions (1998–2001), Labor and Commerce (1998–2001), Militia and Police (1998–1999), Privileges and Elections (2002–2009 and 2013–2014), Science and Technology (1998–2004) and Transportation (2008–2014).

Subsequent career
In June 2014 Brink announced his resignation to become deputy commissioner for aging services under Governor Terry McAuliffe.

Electoral history

References

External links
 (campaign finance)

Project Vote Smart - Representative Robert Brink (VA) profile
Follow the Money - Robert H. Brink
2005 2003 2001 1999 campaign contributions

1946 births
Living people
Democratic Party members of the Virginia House of Delegates
Virginia lawyers
William & Mary Law School alumni
Monmouth College alumni
People from Arlington County, Virginia
Politicians from Chicago
21st-century American politicians